Torlakovac is a village in the municipality of Donji Vakuf, Bosnia and Herzegovina.

Demographics 
According to the 2013 census, its population was 592.

References

Populated places in Donji Vakuf
Villages in the Federation of Bosnia and Herzegovina